Sinking Island: A Jack Norm Investigation is a third-person perspective adventure game that uses point and click game mechanics. Released in France on October 4, 2007. it was developed by White Birds Productions, a company founded and led by Benoît Sokal.

Development
The title's genesis came from Olivier Fontenay, who suggested that Benoît Sokal make police games. Sokal wrote a ten-page draft in 2005. He decided to have a male playable character to offer a change from his Syberia series. The team created a new interface for the game, entitled  PPA (Personal Police Assistant). The game was supported by the Centre National de la Cinématographie. A sequel was originally going to be released, offering a second Jack Norm adventure set in New York.

Plot
The plot is centered on the investigation of the death of a millionaire named Walter Jones. The main acting character in the game is Jack Norm, a police officer entrusted with the task of solving the mystery. The events take place on a fictional island owned by the late Walter Jones in an Art Deco-style tower. The plot takes place over three days and follows a classic murder mystery scheme where a detective needs to uncover the identity of the murderer.

Critical reception

Jean-Marc Oliveres of Clubic wrote that the game would engross players into its story and history. 4Players reviewer Bodo Naser thought that while the game promised a murder mystery akin to those of Agatha Christie, the title did not deliver. Adventure-Treff's Jan Schneider negatively compared the game's world to Paradise and Syberia. IGN offered a negative review, describing the game as having "weary, stranded-island sleuthing at its soggiest". GameSpot thought the game would appeal to adventure fans. Gamekult derided the game's difficult puzzles, sleep-inducing dialogue, and lack of plot momentum.

See also
Amerzone (1999)
Syberia (2002)
Syberia II (2004)
Syberia III (2017)
Syberia: The World Before (2022)

References

External links
Sinking Island at Microïds

2007 video games
Detective video games
Point-and-click adventure games
Microïds games
Windows-only games
Windows games
Video games about police officers
Video games developed in France
Single-player video games